Unseen Hands is a 1924 American silent horror film directed by Jacques Jaccard and starring Wallace Beery, Joseph J. Dowling and Fontaine La Rue. This was apparently the only horror film Jaccard directed, although he made over 80 (mostly action and Western) films from 1914 to 1936. It was also producer Walker Coleman Graves Jr.'s only screenwriting credit.

Plot
Jean Scholast (Beery) makes a favorable impression on a wealthy businessman's wife (La Rue), and she gets her husband George Le Quintrec to hire him. Scholast works his way into the millionaire's life, stealing his wife and his fortune, and eventually murdering the old man. He later begins to experience hallucinations involving the ghost of the murdered man, and in the end, he is frightened to death by the apparition out in the desert.

Cast
 Wallace Beery as Jean Scholast 
 Joseph J. Dowling as George Le Quintrec 
 Fontaine La Rue as Madame Le Quintrec 
 Jack Rollens as Armand Le Quintrec 
 Cleo Madison as Mataoka 
 Jim Corey as Wapita
 Jamie Gray as Nola

References

Bibliography
 Soister, John T. American Silent Horror, Science Fiction and Fantasy Feature Films, 1913-1929. McFarland, 2014.

External links
 
 
 
 

1924 films
1924 horror films
American horror films
Films directed by Jacques Jaccard
American silent feature films
American black-and-white films
Associated Exhibitors films
1920s English-language films
1920s American films
Silent horror films